The Union Federal Party (Afrikaans: Verenigde Federale Party) was a white liberal South African party that broke away from the United Party after the 1953 election. It never gained any seats in Parliament, and ceased to exist in 1960.

Background
The party was led by Senator George Heaton Nicholls who was previously the United Party opposition leader in the Senate. It was formed on 10 May 1953. It was founded by members of Torch Commando from Natal. The party was also said to have support from leaders of the Commando in other provinces.

It was a British diaspora party, committed to retaining links with the British Commonwealth and monarchy. The party was centred in Natal, concerned with ensuring the province's autonomy. Federal provincial autonomy was seen as a way preventing Afrikaner nationalism from dominating the political scene and could include ceding from the Union if that occurred or English language rights in the Union were interfered with. It also wished to explore liberalising the non-white franchise. The liberal franchise policy for non-whites included Indians to be enrolled on a communal voters roll similar to the Coloureds in the Cape Province and the possibility of a voters roll for Black South Africans who were highly educated.

References

Political parties established in 1953
Defunct political parties in South Africa